Vema ewingi is a species of monoplacophoran, a superficially limpet-like marine mollusc. It is found at the northern end of the Peru-Chile Trench and other locations off the coast of Peru.

References

Monoplacophora
Molluscs described in 1959